ZAP70 deficiency, or ZAP70 deficient SCID, is a rare autosomal recessive form of severe combined immunodeficiency (SCID) resulting in a lack of CD8+ T cells. People with this disease lack the capability to fight infections, and it is fatal if untreated.

It is cause by a mutation in the ZAP70 gene.

Presentation
Children with this condition typically present with infections and skin rashes.
Unlike many forms of SCID, absolute lymphocyte count is normal and thymus is present.

Cause
ZAP70 deficiency SCID is caused by a mutation is the ZAP70 gene, which is involved in the development of T cells.

Diagnosis
It is characterized by a lack of CD8+ T cells and the presence of circulating CD4+ T cells which are unresponsive to T-cell receptor (TCR)-mediated stimuli.
Diagnosis is usually made within the first six months of life. Genetic testing is required.

Treatment

Hematopoietic stem cell transplantation is the only known cure for ZAP70 deficient SCID.

Epidemiology 
ZAP70 deficiency SCID is estimated to occur in approximately 1 in 50,000 people. Fewer than fifty people with this condition have been identified.

References

Further reading
 GeneReviews/NCBI/NIH/UW entry on ZAP70-Related Severe Combined Immunodeficiency

External links 

Autosomal recessive disorders
Rare diseases
Combined T and B–cell immunodeficiencies